Al Forno is a restaurant in Providence, Rhode Island by husband and wife Johanne Killeen and George Germon in 1980.  They call their food “Cucina Simpatica: Robust Trattoria Cooking”.

Background
They are known as the birthplace of flatbread pizza.

Killeen and Germon were artists looking for a way to supplement their income when they opened the restaurant.

The couple won a James Beard Foundation Award in 1993 for being the best chefs in the Northeast, and Al Forno was named the best casual restaurant in the world in 1994 by the International Herald Tribune. the International Herald Tribune named Al Forno the Worlds Best Restaurant for casual dining.

Their Apple Tart was featured on The Best Thing I Ever Ate.

Legacy
Alumni of their kitchen include Ken Oringer,Loren Falsone, Eric Moshier and Cassie Piuma.

References

External links
Official website

James Beard Foundation Award winners
Restaurants in Rhode Island
Italian restaurants in the United States
Buildings and structures in Providence County, Rhode Island
Restaurants established in 1980